Utricularia hirta is a small, probably perennial, terrestrial carnivorous plant that belongs to the genus Utricularia. U. hirta is native to India and Southeast Asia, where it can be found in Bangladesh, Cambodia, Laos, Sri Lanka, Thailand, and Vietnam and on the island of Borneo. It was originally named by Jacob Theodor Klein and formally described and published by Johann Heinrich Friedrich Link in 1820. It has been collected in flower between July and December.

See also 
 List of Utricularia species

References 

hirta
Carnivorous plants of Asia
Flora of Bangladesh
Flora of Borneo
Flora of Indo-China
Flora of Sri Lanka
Taxa named by Jacob Theodor Klein
Taxa named by Johann Heinrich Friedrich Link